The Italian record progression men's long jump is recognised by the Italian Athletics Federation (FIDAL).

Record progression

See also
 List of Italian records in athletics
 Women's long jump Italian record progression

References

Long jump M